Faking It is an American teen sitcom series created by Carter Covington that aired on MTV, starring Rita Volk, Katie Stevens, Gregg Sulkin, Michael Willett and Bailey De Young. The show revolves around best friends Amy Raudenfeld (Rita Volk) and Karma Ashcroft (Katie Stevens) who are mistaken for a closeted lesbian couple and outed by their popular, openly gay classmate Shane Harvey (Michael Willett) resulting in a surge of popularity at their offbeat high school. They decide to go along with the ruse as Karma has long desired to be popular, though her crush on Shane's best friend Liam Booker (Gregg Sulkin) threatens to further complicate the situation, as does Amy's conservative soon-to-be stepsister Lauren Cooper (Bailey De Young), who discovers that they're faking it.

The show was renewed for a third season on April 21, 2015. After the completion of the third season, Faking It was cancelled by MTV.

Series overview
{| class="wikitable" style="text-align: center;"
|-
! scope="col" style="padding: 0 8px;" colspan="2" rowspan="2"| Season
! scope="col" style="padding: 0 8px;" colspan="2" rowspan="2"| Episodes
! colspan="2"| Originally aired
|-
! style="padding: 0 8px;"| First aired
! style="padding: 0 8px;"| Last aired
|-
 | scope="row" style="background:#EEDC82; color:#100; text-align:center;"| 
 | 1
 | colspan="2"|8
 | 
 | 
|-
 | scope="row" style="background:#63B8FF; color:#100; text-align:center;"| 
 | rowspan="2" |2
 | rowspan=2|20
 | 10
 | 
 | 
|-
 | scope="row" style="background:#EFCC00; color:#100; text-align:center;"| 
 | scope="row"|10
 | 
 | 
|-
 | scope="row" style="background:#141414; color:#100; text-align:center;"| 
 | 3
 | colspan="2"|10
 | 
 | 
|-
|}

Episodes

Season 1 (2014)

Season 2 (2014–15)

Season 3 (2016)

References

Lists of American comedy-drama television series episodes
Lists of American sitcom episodes
Lists of American teen comedy television series episodes
Lists of American teen drama television series episodes